Khairudin bin Abu Hanipah is a Malaysian politician has served as Member of the Perak State Executive Council (EXCO) in the Barisan Nasional (BN) state administration under Menteri Besar Saarani Mohamad since November 2022 and Member of the Perak State Legislative Assembly (MLA) for Belanja since May 2018. He is a member of the United Malays National Organisation (UMNO), a component party of the BN coalition.

Notes

Election results

External links

References 

United Malays National Organisation politicians
Members of the Perak State Legislative Assembly
Malaysian people of Malay descent
Living people
Year of birth missing (living people)